Pterygia morrisoni is a species of sea snail, a marine gastropod mollusk, in the family Mitridae, the miters or miter snails.

Distribution
This species occurs in Dampier Archipelago.

References

morrisoni
Gastropods described in 2016